Discon is the name given to the three Worldcons held in Washington, D.C.:

 Discon I, 1963
 Discon II, 1974
 DisCon III, 2021